Isocoma veneta (also known as false damiana) is a Mexican species of plants in the family Asteraceae. It is widespread across much of Mexico from Coahuila and Tamaulipas south as far as Oaxaca and Veracruz.

It produces flower heads in clusters at the tips of branches, each head with 17-26 disc flowers but no ray flowers.

References

External links
photo of herbarium specimen collected in Coahuila in 1999

veneta
Endemic flora of Mexico
Flora of Central Mexico
Flora of Northeastern Mexico
Flora of Southwestern Mexico
Flora of Veracruz
Plants described in 1818
Taxa named by Edward Lee Greene